The Urban X Awards is an annual award ceremony held in the United States to honor achievement in ethnic pornography.

Originally known as the Urban Spice Awards, it was established in 2008 by black adult film director Giana Taylor and last awarded in 2012. 
The Urban X awards returned after a 5-year hiatus in 2017 and subsequently thereafter.  The awards recognize achievement by the adult film stars, producers, directors, agencies, and companies who produce Black, Latin, Asian, and interracial adult content. The winners are voted for by fans on the award's website.

Inaugural event
The inaugural Urban Spice Awards ceremony, held on June 8, 2008 at Platinum Live in Studio City (Los Angeles, CA), were hosted by adult film stars Olivia O'Lovely and Sean Michaels. Michaels stated after the event: "People need to recognize the relevance of tonight. This is a $13-14 billion dollar industry and the urban community is such a big part of that. It's really just time to recognize us the right way".

Past events
The 2009 Urban X Awards, held at Boulevard3 in Hollywood (Los Angeles, CA), were hosted by Mr. Marcus and Roxy Reynolds.

The 2010 Urban X Awards were held at the 740 Club in Los Angeles on July 13, 2010. The hosts were Misty Stone and Dana DeArmond.

The 2011 Urban X Awards were held at the Vault Nightclub in Los Angeles on July 23, 2011. The hosts were Nyomi Banxxx and Alexander DeVoe.

The 2012 Urban X Awards were held at the Palace of the Stars in Glendale on July 22, 2012. The hosts were Nyomi Banxxx and Alexander Devoe. The year 2012 was the first year that the event was filmed for broadcast.

Hall of Fame Inductees

 2008
 Byron Long
 Devlin Weed
 Heather Hunter
 Jeannie Pepper
 Johnny Keyes
 Julian St. Jox
 Lacey Duvalle
 Lexington Steele
 Mr Marcus
 Michael Stefano
 Ray Victory
 Sean Michaels
 Vanessa del Rio
 2009
 Kitten
 Kim Eternity
 Mark Anthony
 Mika Tan
 Sinnamon Love
 Sledgehammer
 TT Boy
 Vanessa Blue
 Wesley Pipes
 2010
 Alexander DeVoe
 Diana DeVoe
 Guy DiSilva
 Jada Fire
 Mercedes Ashley
 Nina Hartley
 Olivia O'Lovely
 Ron Hightower
 2011
 Francesca Le
 Jack Napier
 Jade Hsu
 Lisa Ann
 Justin Long
 Kelly Starr
 Mr. Pete
 Mandingo
 Miles Long
 Sara Jay
 Shyla Stylez
 Spantaneeus Xtasty
 Suave XXX
 2017
 Asa Akira
 Brad Armstrong
 Carmen Hayes
 Cherokee
 Farrah Foxxx
 Jada Stevens
 Jazmine Cashmere
 John E Depth
 Lisa Daniels
 Mia Isabella
 Misty Stone
 Pinky
 Prince Yahshua
 Rebecca Bardoux
 Roxy Reynolds
 Skyy Black
 Tony Eveready
 2018
 Alexis Amore
 Dapper Dan
 Evan Stone
 Gianna Michaels
 Kaylani Lei
 LT
 Michelle Maylene
 Mone Divine
 Nat Turnher
 Nyomi Banxxx
 Richard Mann
 2019
 Alana Evans
 Axel Braun
 Beauty Dior
 Candace Von
 Charlie Mac
 Chocolate & Mocha
 Chyanne Jacobs
 Havana Ginger
 Ice La Foxx
 James Bartholet
 Joachim Kessef
 Kapri Styles
 Mick Blue
 2020
 Black Cat
 Brian Pumper
 Caramel 
 Cindy Starfall
 Dynamite 
 Emy Reyes
 Marica Hase
 Nicky Starks
 Priya Rai
 Ray Black
 Richelle Ryan
 Rico Strong
 Shane Diesel
 Sophie Dee
 Sydnee Capri
 TS Foxxxy
 Tee Reel
 Tia Cyrus
 2022
 Adina Jewel
 Angel Eyes
 Ana Foxxx
 Annie Cruz
 Ivan
 Jean Claude Baptiste
 Jeremy
 Joslyn James
 Marie Luv
 Mya G
 Natassia Dreams
 Nina Elle
 Phoenix Marie
 Rico Shades
 Rock the Icon
 Samone Taylor
 Shaundam
 Sofia Rose
 Vida Valentine
 Will Ryder

List of winners 2008–2012

References

External links
 
 Urban X Awards Past Winners
 "Tera Patrick, Evan Seinfeld to Present at 1st Annual Urban Spice Awards", May 2, 2008
 "1st Annual Urban Spice Awards Pre-Party Friday", Press release, May 27, 2008
 Second Annual "Urban X Awards Winners Announced"
 Fifth Annual "Urban X Award Winners Announced"
 Urban X Award nominations
 "Urban X Award Winners Announced", July 29, 2009
 2009 Urban X Award Winners

Pornographic film awards
Ethnic pornography
American pornographic film awards